Kristaq Rama (193230 July 1998) was an Albanian sculptor, art educator and a member of the Communist Party in Albania under Enver Hoxha's rule.
He was the father of current Albanian Prime Minister Edi Rama.

Early life and education 
He was born in Durrës to Vlash Rama and Veronika Kolombi, sister of Zef Kolombi.

Rama graduated from the Artistic Lyceum "Jordan Misja", in the Department of Fine Arts in 1951, and three years later left Albania to study in Leningrad, Soviet Union.

Career
After graduation, he returned to Albania, where he worked in Tirana, primarily as superintendent of fine arts at the Albanian Ministry of Culture, and at the same time taught as an external lecturer at the Higher Institute of Arts of Tirana.

Works 
As a sculptor, Rama created several busts of warriors, people portraits, female sculptures, as well as other decorations.

Implication with communist dictatorship crimes 
In August 1988, Rama signed along with Ramiz Alia and others documents for the death penalty of poet Havzi Nela by hanging. Other documents show that Rama signed for the death penalty for Enver Osmani, a 29-year-old from Dibra.

Personal life
He is the father of Edi Rama, president of the Socialist Party of Albania and Prime Minister of Albania, also several times former mayor of Tirana city.

Rama died on 11 April 1998, aged 66, after suffering a heart attack in his hometown of Tirana.

See also

 Art of Albania
 List of Albanians
 List of sculptors

References 

Date of birth missing
Date of death missing
1932 births
1998 deaths
20th-century Albanian sculptors
20th-century Albanian educators
20th-century sculptors
Albanian expatriates in the Soviet Union
Albanian sculptors
Art educators
People from Durrës